"Traum" ("Dream") is a 2014 single by German rapper Cro. Released on 9 May 2014, it is his seventh single and the first release from his 2014 album Melodie. It was also released as a remix CD containing six tracks, including the radio single, remixes and instrumentals of the song. On 17 February 2015, Cro released an English version of the song titled "Dream" on iTunes.

Track list
Single
"Traum" (3:17)
"Traum" (instrumental) (3:15)
EP Traum
"Traum (3:14)
"Traum" (instrumental) (3:14)
"Traum" (MRLN remix) (4:17)
"Traum" (Cro remix) (4:01)
"Traum" (MRLN remix) [instrumental] (4:17)
"Traum" (Cro remix) [instrumental] (4:00)

Charts

Weekly charts

Year-end charts

Certifications

References

2014 singles
Cro (rapper) songs
Number-one singles in Austria
Number-one singles in Germany
Number-one singles in Switzerland
2014 songs
German-language songs
Songs written by Freedo (producer)